Hollisteria is a genus of plants in the family Polygonaceae with a single species, Hollisteria lanata. It is endemic to California. It is known by the common name false spikeflower.

The genus was named for California rancher William Welles Hollister.

References

External links 
 Jepson Manual Treatment
 USDA Plants Profile
 Flora of North America
 Photo gallery

Monotypic Polygonaceae genera
Endemic flora of California
Flora without expected TNC conservation status